Margaret Stafford may refer to:

 Margaret Basset, Baroness Stafford (13th century), wife of Edmund Stafford, 1st Baron Stafford
 Margaret de Audley, Countess of Stafford (1318-1349)
 Margaret de Stafford, Baroness Neville de Raby (1364-1396) wife of Ralph Neville, 1st Earl of Westmorland
 Margaret Beaufort, Countess of Stafford (1437-1474)
 Lady Margaret Beaufort (1441-1509; "Mary Stafford" 1458-1471) wife of Sir Henry Stafford; the King-mother of Henry VII of England
 Margaret Grey, Countess of Wiltshire (15th century; "Mary Stafford" 1494-1500) wife of Edward Stafford, 2nd Earl of Wiltshire
 Margaret Stafford (15th century) mother of John de Vere, 14th Earl of Oxford
 Margaret Fogge Stafford (16th century) mother of William Stafford (courtier)
 Margaret Stafford Cheyne Bulmer (died 1537) daughter of Edward Stafford, 3rd Duke of Buckingham, wife of Sir John Bulmer of the Bulmer family; she was burned at the stake for the Bigod's rebellion
 Margaret Corbet Stafford (17th century) wife of William Stafford (MP)
 Margaret Stafford (18th century) wife of Theophilus Blakeney
 Margaret Stafford (born 1931) UK fencer
 Margaret Stafford (late 20th century) mother of Matthew Stafford

See also

 Stafford (disambiguation)
 
 Margaret (disambiguation)
 Stafford (disambiguation)